Oak Head is a mountain in Barnstable County, Massachusetts. Mount Ararat is located east and Snake Hills is located west-southwest of Oak Head.

References

Mountains of Massachusetts
Mountains of Barnstable County, Massachusetts